Didem Kınalı (born 6 June 1986) is a Turkish belly dancer, model, and singer. She has been dancing since her childhood. She has gained some measure of international recognition since she started appearing on the live Turkish variety television programme called the İbo Show, hosted by İbrahim Tatlıses. She was brought up in Gaziosmanpaşa, and is of Romani descent, her mother emigrated from Thessaloniki, also a belly dancer and her father emigrated from Yugoslavia.

References

Belly dancers
1986 births
Turkish female dancers
Turkish female erotic dancers
Living people
Romani dancers
Turkish people of Yugoslav descent
Turkish Romani people
Turkish people of Greek descent